Mduduzi Manana was the South African Deputy Minister of Higher Education and Training and member of parliament from 2009 to 2017.

Manana earned a BA degree in Political Science and Sociology from University of Natal and was elected to the Regional Executive Committee (REC) of the ANCYL in the Gert Sibande Region in 2006. In 2009, he served in the International Relations & Cooperation and Public Works Portfolio Committees and was later appointed a Whip of the Portfolio Committees on Transport and Public Service and Administration and Governance and Monitoring Cluster in 2011.

Assault allegations and charges
On 5 August 2017, Mduduzi Manana was involved in an altercation in which he assaulted 3 women for allegedly calling him "gay". This happened at a night club in Johannesburg in the early hours of the morning. He later confessed when he was being confronted by the brother of one of the victims. South African Police Minister Fikile Mbalula said a case was opened against him at Douglasdale Police station and Manama would be arrested as soon as they had gathered enough evidence. He also highlighted that he would not be given special treatment because he was a member of parliament.

Verdict and sentencing
Manana pleaded guilty to the charges of assault with intent to do grievous bodily harm in the Randburg Magistrates Court in Johannesburg. Video evidence that went viral on the internet was also submitted as evidence. He was found guilty and sentenced to (1 year in prison or a fine of R100,000.00) and compensation to his victims, as well as 500 hours of community service and required to go for counselling. He was also declared unfit to possess a firearm.

He was allowed to remain as an ANC backbencher in the National Assembly.

References

External links
 

Living people
1984 births
African National Congress politicians
Members of the National Assembly of South Africa
University of Natal alumni